The 1966 United States Senate election in Georgia was held on November 8, 1966. Incumbent Democratic Senator Richard Russell Jr. was elected to a seventh term in office.

On September 14, Russell won the Democratic primary with 90.59% of the vote against only nominal opposition from fellow Democrat Harry Hyde. At this time, Georgia was a one-party state and the Democratic nomination was tantamount to victory. No Republican had run for Senate in Georgia since 1932. Russell won the November general election without an opponent.

Russell did not complete his term; he died in January 1971.

Democratic primary

Candidates
Harry Hyde, resident of Marietta
Richard Russell Jr., incumbent United States Senator

Results

General election

References

1966
Georgia
United States Senate
Single-candidate elections